Sindlingen is a quarter of Frankfurt am Main, Germany. It is part of the Ortsbezirk West and is subdivided into the Stadtbezirke Sindlingen-Süd and Sindlingen-Nord.

Frankfurt Sindlingen station provides access to the Rhine-Main S-Bahn line S1.

References

Districts of Frankfurt